The 2010 European Figure Skating Championships was a senior international figure skating competition in the 2009–10 season. Medals were awarded in the disciplines of men's singles, ladies' singles, pair skating, and ice dancing. The event was held at the Saku Suurhall Arena in Tallinn, Estonia from 18 to 24 January 2010.

Qualification
The competition was open to skaters from European ISU member nations who had reached the age of 15 before 1 July 2009. The corresponding competition for non-European skaters were the 2010 Four Continents Championships. National associations selected their entries based on their own criteria. Based on the results of the 2009 European Championships, each country was allowed between one and three entries per discipline. The following countries earned more than the minimum.

Schedule
All times are Eastern European Time (UTC+2).

 Tuesday, 19 January
 13:30 Ice dancing – Compulsory dance
 18:45 Opening ceremony
 19:20 Pairs – Short program
 Wednesday, 20 January
 11:00 Men – Short program
 19:00 Pairs – Free skating (group 1)
 20:30 Pairs – Free skating (group 2 to 4)
 Thursday, 21 January
 13:00 Ice dancing – Original dance
 18:45 Men – Free skating (group 1)
 20:15 Men – Free skating (group 2 to 4)
 Friday, 22 January
 10:00 Ladies – Short Program
 18:40 Ice dancing – Free dance (group 1)
 20:00 Ice dancing – Free dance (group 2 to 4)
 Saturday, 23 January
 13:30 Ladies – Free skating (group 1)
 15:00 Ladies – Free skating (group 2 to 4)
 20:00 Closing reception
 Sunday, 24 January
 15:30 Exhibition gala

Medals table

Competition notes
In the men's short program, Evgeni Plushenko set a new world record of 91.30 points. He won his sixth European title. Stéphane Lambiel won his third European silver medal and Brian Joubert won his 9th consecutive European medal. In ladies, Carolina Kostner won her third European title, defeating the reigning champion Laura Lepistö, who won her third European medal. Elene Gedevanishvili won Georgia's first medal at an ISU Championships.

In pair skating, Yuko Kavaguti / Alexander Smirnov won their first European title, edging out defending champions Aliona Savchenko / Robin Szolkowy. In the free skate, they set a new free skate world record of 139.23 points, only to have their record broken by the Chinese silver medallists Pang Qing / Tong Jian at the 2010 Olympic Games. In ice dancing, Oksana Domnina / Maxim Shabalin won their second European title, after previously winning in 2008. Federica Faiella / Massimo Scali won their second straight silver medals while the defending champions, Jana Khokhlova / Sergei Novitski, dropped to third.

Results

Men

Ladies

Pairs

Ice dancing

References

External links

 
 
 ISU Media Guide
 

European Figure Skating Championships
European Championships
European Figure Skating Championships
European Championships 2010
January 2010 sports events in Europe
Sports competitions in Tallinn
21st century in Tallinn